The following article is a summary of the '''2011–12 soccer season in Australia.

Domestic leagues

A-League

The 2011–12 A-League began on 8 October 2011 and ended on 22 April 2012.

Regular season

Finals

W-League

The 2011–12 W-League began on 22 October 2011 and ended on 28 January 2012.

Regular season

Finals

International club competitions

AFC Champions League

The 2012 AFC Champions League began on 10 February 2012 and ended on 10 November 2012. Brisbane Roar qualified after winning the 2011 A-League Grand Final, Central Coast Mariners after coming second in the 2010–11 A-League and Adelaide United, after coming third, entered in the qualifying stages.

Adelaide United

Brisbane Roar

Central Coast Mariners

National teams

Men's senior

Friendlies

World Cup qualifying

Men's under-23

Friendlies

Olympic qualifying

Men's under-20

Friendlies

FIFA U-20 World Cup

AFC U-19 Championship qualifying

Men's under 17

AFC U-16 Championship qualifying

AFF U-16 Youth Championship

Women's senior

Friendlies

Olympic qualifying

Women's under-20

AFC U-19 Women's Championship

Women's under-17

Friendlies

AFC U-16 Women's Championship

References

External links
 Football Federation Australia official website

2011–12 in Australian women's soccer
Seasons in Australian soccer